Lloyd Creek is a stream in the U.S. state of Georgia.

Lloyd Creek was named after an 18th-century pioneer settler. A variant name is "Loyd Creek".

References

Rivers of Georgia (U.S. state)
Rivers of Lincoln County, Georgia
Rivers of Wilkes County, Georgia